My Big Fat Greek Wedding is a 2002 romantic comedy film directed by Joel Zwick and written by Nia Vardalos, who also stars in the film as Fotoula "Toula" Portokalos, a middle-class Greek American woman who falls in love with White Anglo-Saxon Protestant Ian Miller. The film received generally positive reviews from critics and, at the 75th Academy Awards, it was nominated for the Academy Award for Best Original Screenplay.

A sleeper hit, the film became the highest-grossing romantic comedy domestically of all time, and grossed $241.4 million in North America, despite never reaching number one at the box office during its release. It was the highest-grossing film with that distinction for 14 years until the animated film Sing grossed $268 million in 2016.

The film spawned a franchise, which inspired the short-lived 2003 CBS TV series My Big Fat Greek Life, and a film sequel titled My Big Fat Greek Wedding 2, which was released on March 25, 2016, by Universal Pictures. A third film, entitled My Big Fat Greek Wedding 3, is currently in production at Universal Pictures' division Focus Features.

Plot
Thirty-year-old Fotoula "Toula" Portokalos is a member of a large, loud, intrusive Greek family that only wants her to get married and have children. Frumpy and meek, she works in her family's Chicago restaurant, "Dancing Zorba's", but longs to do something more with her life. While working one day, she is immediately smitten with Ian Miller, a handsome school teacher. She amuses Ian when he catches her staring at him and jokingly calls herself his "own private Greek statue". That evening, Toula offers to go to college to learn about computers so she can improve the restaurant, but her father, Gus, becomes emotional, claiming Toula wants to leave him. Her mother, Maria, comforts Toula and convinces Gus to agree to Toula's idea.

As the weeks pass, Toula gains more confidence and changes her image, switching her thick-framed glasses for contact lenses, styling her hair, and wearing makeup and brighter clothes that show off her figure. She sees a notice for a course on computers and tourism and tells her Aunt Voula, who owns a travel agency, that she could apply what she learns in the course to Voula's business. Voula agrees, and she and Maria slyly convince Gus to agree as well.

Toula's happiness working at the travel agency catches Ian's attention and he asks her to dinner. Knowing her family would not approve of her dating a non-Greek, Toula lies that she is taking a pottery class to see Ian.  Ian eventually realizes Toula is the waitress from Dancing Zorba's; contrary to Toula's fear that he would lose interest in her, Ian reaffirms his fondness for her. They continue dating and fall in love.

Toula's lie is ultimately exposed. Gus is furious that Ian did not ask his permission to date Toula, even though they are grown adults. Gus refuses to let them continue seeing each other, but they ignore his decree, so Gus introduces Toula to single friends of his own, to no avail.

Ian proposes marriage and Toula accepts.  Maria tells Gus that he must accept their marriage, but Gus remains upset because Ian is not a member of the Greek Orthodox Church. To get the family to accept him, Ian agrees to be baptized into the church. The Portokalos family does finally accept him but constantly inserts themselves into the wedding planning, designing ugly bridesmaid's dresses and misspelling Ian's mother's name on their wedding invitations.

Ian's quiet, conservative parents meet the entire family during a loud and extravagant Greek family dinner and are overwhelmed by the experience, frustrating Gus. Toula worries about whether her father has accepted Ian. Maria explains that, growing up, her family experienced many hardships, and that she and Gus simply want her to be happy. Toula's grandmother shows Toula photos of herself as a young woman and the crown she wore at her wedding, which Toula puts on. When the three women all look at Toula in her bedroom mirror, the sight of three generations in the reflection makes Toula smile with pride. The wedding proceeds as planned.

At the wedding reception, Gus gives a heartfelt speech focusing on how the differences in the newlyweds' backgrounds do not matter. He and Maria then surprise Toula and Ian with a house as a wedding gift; Toula is speechless at the gesture of love from her father. As the two families dance together, Toula narrates that while her family is indeed loud, odd, and somewhat dramatic, she knows they love her and will always be there for her.

Six years later, Toula and Ian leave their house—conveniently located right next door to Gus and Maria's—to walk their daughter to Greek school.

Cast

 Nia Vardalos as Fotoula "Toula" Portokalos
 Christina Eleusiniotis as Toula at 6
 Marita Zouravlioff as Toula at 12
 John Corbett as Ian Miller
 Lainie Kazan as Maria Portokalos, Toula's mother
 Michael Constantine as Costas "Gus" Portokalos, Toula's father
 Andrea Martin as Aunt Voula
 Louis Mandylor as Nikos "Nick" Portokalos, Toula's brother
 Gia Carides as Cousin Nikki
 Gerry Mendicino as Uncle Taki
 Joey Fatone as Cousin Angelo
 Bess Meisler as Yiayia (Grandma)
 Stavroula Logothettis as Athena Portokalos, Toula's sister
 Ian Gomez as Mike, Ian's best friend; he was Vardalos's real-life husband at the time of filming
 Bruce Gray as Rodney Miller, Ian's father
 Fiona Reid as Harriet Miller, Ian's mother
 Jayne Eastwood as Mrs. White, a non-Greek neighbor

Production

Development
My Big Fat Greek Wedding started as a one-woman play written by and starring Vardalos, performed for six weeks at the Hudson Backstage Theatre in Los Angeles in the summer of 1997. Vardalos later jokingly stated that she only wrote the play "to get a better agent". The play was based on Vardalos's own family in Winnipeg in Canada and on her experience marrying a non-Greek man (actor Ian Gomez). The play was popular and was sold out for much of its run, in part due to Vardalos's marketing it across Greek Orthodox churches in the area. Several Hollywood executives and celebrities saw it, including actress Rita Wilson, who is herself of Greek origin; Wilson convinced her husband, actor Tom Hanks, to see it as well.

Vardalos began meeting various executives about making a film version of the play and began writing a screenplay as well. However, the meetings proved fruitless because the executives insisted on making changes that they felt would make the film more marketable, to which Vardalos objected. These included changing the plot, getting a known actress in the lead role (Marisa Tomei was one name mentioned), and changing the family's ethnicity to Hispanic. Two months after the play's initial run ended, Hanks's production company, Playtone, contacted Vardalos about producing a film based on her vision for it; they also agreed to remount the play in early 1998, this time at LA's Globe Theatre. Hanks later said that casting Vardalos in the lead role "brings a huge amount of integrity to the piece because it's Nia's version of her own life and her own experience. I think that shows through on the screen and people recognize it."

In 2000, while in Toronto doing pre-production for the film, Vardalos and Playtone producer Gary Goetzman overheard actor John Corbett (who was in town shooting the film Serendipity) at a bar, telling a friend of his about having read the script for My Big Fat Greek Wedding, and being upset that he couldn't make the auditions. Vardalos and Goetzman approached Corbett and offered him the part of Ian Miller on the spot, which he accepted.

Filming

Despite being based on life in the Greek community of Winnipeg, the film was set in Chicago and shot in both Toronto and Chicago. Toronto Metropolitan University and the Greektown neighborhood feature prominently in the film. The home used to depict Gus and Maria Portokalos's residence (as well as the home bought next door at the end of the film for Toula and Ian) is located on Glenwood Crescent just off O'Connor Drive in the Toronto suburb of East York. The real home representing the Portokalos' residence has most of the external ornamentation that was shown in the film. Also, some minor parts of the movie were shot at Jarvis Collegiate Institute in Toronto.

Release
After a February 2002 premiere, it was initially released in the United States via a limited release on April 19, 2002 before receiving a wider release worldwide over the summer, including a wide release in the United States on August 2.

Reception

Box office
My Big Fat Greek Wedding became a sleeper hit and grew steadily from its limited release. Despite never hitting the number one spot for a box office weekend and being an independent film with a $5 million budget, it ultimately grossed over $368.7 million worldwide, becoming one of the top romantic films of the 21st century. It was the fifth highest-grossing film of 2002 in the United States and Canada, with USD$241,438,208, and the highest-grossing romantic comedy domestically in history. Domestically, it also held the record for the highest-grossing film never having been number one on the weekly North American box office charts until the 2016 release of the animated film Sing. However, adjusted for inflation, the gross of My Big Fat Greek Wedding was still higher, equivalent to $ million in 2016. The film is among the most profitable of all time, with a 6150% return on an(inflation-adjusted) cost of $6 million to produce.

Critical response
On Rotten Tomatoes, the film holds an approval rating of 76% based on 129 reviews, with an average rating of 6.7/10. The site's critical consensus reads, "Though it sometimes feels like a television sitcom, My Big Fat Greek Wedding is good-hearted, lovable, and delightfully eccentric, with a sharp script and lead performance from Nia Vardalos." On Metacritic, which assigns a rating based on reviews, the film has an average score of 62 out of 100, based on 29 critics, indicating "generally favorable reviews". Audiences polled by CinemaScore gave the film an average grade of "A−" on an A+ to F scale.

Accolades
 2008: AFI's 10 Top 10:
 Nominated Romantic Comedy Film

10th-anniversary edition
In 2012, a 10th anniversary edition of the film was released via DVD and Blu-ray by HBO. The edition contains a digital copy of the film and features deleted scenes as well as a 30-minute retrospective with Vardalos and Corbett.

Lawsuit
The cast (with the exception of Vardalos, who had a separate deal), as well as Hanks' production company, Playtone, later sued the studio for their part of the profits, charging that Gold Circle Films was engaging in so-called "Hollywood accounting" practices.

Legacy

Television series

The film inspired the brief 2003 TV series My Big Fat Greek Life, with most of the major characters played by the same actors, with the exception of Steven Eckholdt replacing Corbett as the husband. Corbett had already signed on to the TV series Lucky. He was scheduled to appear as the best friend of his replacement's character, but the show was cancelled before he appeared. The show received poor reviews from critics noting the random character entrances and serious plot "adjustments" that did not match the film.

The seven episodes from the series are available on DVD from Sony Pictures Home Entertainment, whose TV studio division produced the show.

Sequels

My Big Fat Greek Wedding 2 (2016)

In a 2009 interview for her film My Life in Ruins, asked about a possible sequel for My Big Fat Greek Wedding, Vardalos stated that she had an idea for a sequel and had started writing it, hinting that, like Ruins, the film would be set in Greece.

Asked about a sequel again in a November 2012 interview, she stated:

On May 27, 2014, various news and media outlets reported that a sequel was in the works. Nia Vardalos later confirmed this via Twitter, and she also has written a script for the film. The first trailer for My Big Fat Greek Wedding 2 was aired on NBC's The Today Show on November 11, 2015 and it was released on March 25, 2016, to negative critical reception and modest box office success.

My Big Fat Greek Wedding 3
In late June 2016, Vardalos hinted at the possibility of a third film, saying that although no writing has been done, she does have an idea. On April 8, 2021, it was announced that My Big Fat Greek Wedding 3 was in development, to be written by Vardalos as an independent film, who will reprise her role as co-star. The project was also revealed to have been delayed by the COVID-19 pandemic, in which production will commence once the studios maintains insurance for its crew, with principal photography scheduled to take place in Greece. On October 1, 2021, Vardalos confirmed that the script for the third film had been completed and that would involve another Greek wedding. On May 15, 2022, it was announced that filming will take place throughout Greece in the summer of 2022, with large portions being shot on Corfu from July 5 to August 3, 2022. On June 22, 2022, it was announced that Vardalos will serve as director on the third film. Principal photography commenced on June 22, 2022 in Athens, Greece, and wrapped on August 10, 2022. Release of the film is anticipated in 2023 or 2024. It will be dedicated to the memory of Michael Constantine, who died on August 31, 2021 at the age of 94. The project will be a joint-venture production between The Playtone Company, Gold Circle Films, HBO Films, and Focus Features. The film is scheduled to be released on September 8, 2023.

References

External links

 
 
 
 
 

2002 films
2002 independent films
2002 romantic comedy films
2000s American films
2000s Canadian films
2000s English-language films
American films based on plays
American independent films
American interfaith romance films
American romantic comedy films
Canadian films based on plays
Canadian romantic comedy films
Canadian independent films
Eastern Orthodox ecumenical and interfaith relations
English-language Canadian films
Films about Greek-American culture
Films about weddings in the United States
Films adapted into television shows
Films directed by Joel Zwick
Films produced by Gary Goetzman
Films produced by Tom Hanks
Films set in Chicago
Films shot in Toronto
Films with screenplays by Nia Vardalos
Gold Circle Films films
HBO Films films
IFC Films films
Playtone films